This is a list of episodes from the children's television series Franklin.

Series overview

Episodes

Season 1: 1997–1998

Season 2: 1998

Season 3: 1999–2000

Season 4: 2000

Season 5: 2002

Season 6: 2004

References

 Franklin on Amazon.com
 Franklin on the TVDB

External links

Lists of Canadian children's animated television series episodes
Lists of Nickelodeon television series episodes
Franklin the Turtle (books)